Élie Pénot (born 24 January 1950) is a French former sports shooter. He competed at the 1972, 1976 and the 1984 Summer Olympics.

References

1950 births
Living people
French male sport shooters
Olympic shooters of France
Shooters at the 1972 Summer Olympics
Shooters at the 1976 Summer Olympics
Shooters at the 1984 Summer Olympics
Place of birth missing (living people)
20th-century French people